The Ogontz River is a  river on the Upper Peninsula of Michigan in the United States. It is a tributary of Ogontz Bay, an arm of Big Bay de Noc on Lake Michigan.

See also
List of rivers of Michigan

References

Michigan  Streamflow Data from the USGS

Rivers of Michigan
Tributaries of Lake Michigan